Kommissar Hjuler (born Detlev Hjuler; 1967) works as a sound recordist in the field of Noise and Post-industrial music, visual artist, film maker and police officer at Flensburg, a town on the German border with Denmark. He often works together with his wife Mama Baer as Kommissar Hjuler und Frau. As self-taught artist he began making music in 1999 and visual art in 2006. He is considered to work in the field of neo dada, whereas his output also contains elements of fluxus, art brut.

Work

Music releases are available at independent labels like Intransitive Recordings, and Nihilist Records.

Kommissar Hjuler und Frau performed at several festivals like Colour out of Space Festival at Brighton, Zappanale, UND #6/ART Karlsruhe, Festival Bruit de la Neige at Annecy, Avantgarde Festival Schiphorst, Blurred Edges Hamburg, Incubate Festival Tilburg, Rapid Ear Movement Festival by Projektgruppe Neue Musik e. V. Bremen, Brise°3 festival Flensburg, and at artists' venues like Morden Tower, Cafe Oto, Z33 Kunstencentrum, MS Stubnitz, Weserburg, iLLUSEUM Amsterdam, Gängeviertel Hamburg, Upper Church Gallery Edinburgh, Centre For Contemporary Art Warsaw/Ujazdów Castle, Museum of Modern Fine Art on Dmitrovskaya (Rostov on Don), KM Music Conservatory, Boekie Woekie Amsterdam, Lokaal01 Breda, Grambacht Mechelen, Extrapool, Künstlerhaus Sootbörn, or Mary Bauermeister's performance space.

His visual art has been exhibited in solo and groups shows at locations like the Institute of Contemporary Arts, Schloss Liedberg (Korschenbroich), Museum Obere Saline (Bad Kissing), Neues Museum Weserburg, Haus der Kleinen Künste (München), Kunstverein Harburger Bahnhof (Hamburg), Hamburger Bahnhof (Berlin), Atelierhaus & Galerie A24 (Bergisch-Gladbach), Jan van Eyck Academie, Sallis Benny Theatre (Brighton), VAC Gallery (Northwich), Museum Huelsmann Bielefeld, Museum of Contemporary Art Australia, Museum Brasileiro da Escultura (São Paulo) and at several galleries like Kunstraum Winterthur, Galerie Cross Art (Berlin), Itami City Gallery (Japan), fzkke Euskichen, kunsTTempel (Kassel), The Box (Düsseldorf), ARTpool (St. Petersburg), Fabbrica Immagine (Rome), Flux Factory (Long Island City), Chicago Cultural Center, 6028 Gallery (Chicago), Eyedrum. Selected art works are part of collections like Artpool Art Research Center, Avant Writing Collection by the Ohio State University, Fondazione Bonotto, the VAC Archive Northwich, the Jan van Eyck Academie, the Wolf Vostell Archive, and the ZKM Karlsruhe.

Short films by Kommissar Hjuler have been presented at European festivals like 12. Internationales Kurzfilmfestival Muenchen 2010, Vienna Independent Shorts 2011, Leeds International Film Festival 2011, and at Museum of Contemporary Art, Chicago.

Since November 9, 2009 he has been a member of the NO!art movement, founded by Boris Lurie, Stanley Fisher and Sam Goodman at March gallery New York in 1960.

The German novelist Peter Rathke, who works under the pseudonym FOLTERGAUL, represented Kommissar Hjuler as a character at his novel Im Knast mit Kommissar Hjuler und Mama Baer.

Collaboration

Kommissar Hjuler shares concept albums with Medium Medium, Jonathan Meese, Tim Berresheim, Thurston Moore, Joël Hubaut, Franz Kamin, Antye Greie, Marc Hurtado, DDAA, Willem de Ridder, Maja Ratkje, Jerome Noetinger, De Fabriek, Derek Beaulieu, Wolf Vostell, Bill Dietz, Anna Homler & David Moss, Gianni-Emilio Simonetti, David Dellafiora, Hannah Silva, Enzo Minarelli, Ben Patterson, Morphogenesis, Smegma, The Haters, Jaap Blonk, Markus Kupferblum, Anton G. Leitner, Anja Lautermann, Peter Issig, Thilo Schölpen, Uwe Möllhusen, Karlheinz Essl, Andreas Lechner, Rainer Fabich, Jo Kondo, Peter Weibel, Steve Dalachinsky & David Liebman, Faust, Mischa Badasyan, Andy Strauß, Wolf Hogekamp & Lino Ziegel, Nora-Eugenie Gomringer, Xóchil A. Schütz, Daniel Spicer, Sindre Bjerga, Paul Fuchs & Zoro Babel, Jenny Michel & Fredrik Olofsson, Louis Jucker, Azoikum, Jeroen Diepenmaat, Gerhard Stäbler, Kunsu Shim, Peter Ablinger, Sven-Åke Johansson, Rudolf Eb.er, Hartmut Geerken, Pyrolator, Sabrina Benaim, Tonya Ingram, Daniel Menche, Negativland, Alfred Harth, Magnús Pálsson, Tom Surgal, The Nihilist Spasm Band, David Lee Myers, Jerry Hunt, Philip Krumm, Dan Lander, Ditterich von Euler-Donnersperg, Emil Siemeister, Gerhard Laber, mlehst, Jean-Jacques Birgé, Un Drame Musical Instantané, Alexander Kibanov.

He collaborated with numerous artists including Family Fodder, Conrad Schnitzler & Ken Montgomery, GX Jupitter-Larsen, Lasse Marhaug, Dino Felipe, Brume, Amor Fati, Lt. Caramel, Anla Courtis, Andrew Liles,  Jean-Louis Costes, Af ursin, Dada Action Group, Clemens Schittko, Steve Dalachinsky, Gianni-Emilio Simonetti, Hans-Joachim Hespos, Milan Knizak, Emil Siemeister, Arnulf Meifert, Gintas K, The New Blockaders, Bene Gesserit, Bryan Lewis Saunders, Frank Klötgen, Jürgen Palmtag, Wolfgang Kindermann, Christoph Ogiermann, Al Margolis, Frank Rowenta, Karl Bösmann, Sigtryggur Berg Sigmarsson, Rod Summers, Denis Dufour, Jean-Louis Costes, Z'EV, John M. Bennett, Rolf Schobert, Franz Graf, The Oval Language, Klaus Girnus, Tooth Kink, Eric Lunde, Roel Meelkop, Frans de Waard, Richard Ramirez, Jan Kruml, Robert Ridley-Shackleton, Neal D. Retke, Torturing Nurse, Le Syndicat, Pacific 231, Wassily Bosch & Rodin Anton, Wataru Kasahara, Jaan Patterson, Goodiepal, Smell and Quim,  Kouta Yamamoto, Alig Fodder. 

Kommissar Hjuler und Frau performed with artists like PAAK/Peter Kastner, Jan van Wissen, Caracho, Uwe Möllhusen, Bernd Brecht, Ludo Mich, Jan van den Dobbelsteen, Eugene Chadbourne, Kenzo Kusuda, Clive Graham, Dead Labour Process, Hundred Foot Road & Sukanyan Sunthareswaran, Closedunruh, Ninni Morgia & Silvia Kastel, Heather Leigh Murray, John Wiese and others.

As visual artist he collaborated with albrecht/d., Reed Altemus, Vittore Baroni, Geert Baas, Dmitry Babenko, Wolfgang Peter Brunner, Keith A. Buchholz, Jonathan Dilas, Ad Breedveld, Jonathan Caldwell, Daniela Floersheim, Dadanautik, Catherine Drury, Daniel Eltinger, Angela Ferrara, Ace Farren Ford, Kollektiv G.R.A.M./Martin Behr, danma vs. v2r2/Dan Ma & Veronica Reeves, Clayton Patterson, Jaroslav Divis, Bert Feddema, Jean Kiboi, Norbert Futscherndorf, Phillip Graffham, Rachel Heinold, Peter Trautner, Barbara Rapp, Jean Lessenich, Jan van Hasselt, Karen Houser, Katrien De Blauwer, Stefan Heuer, Veronika Olma, Minouche Marie-Dit-Beaufils, Linus Malmqvist, Vlado Ketch, Jürgen O. Olbrich, Reiner Maria Matysik, Alex Mazzitelli, Ulrike Oppel, Massimo Nota, Jessica Molnar, Yukiko Nasu, Eva Moll, Jose Ney Mila, Armando Ramos, Klaus Rudolf, Kong Wee Pang, M. P. Landis, Odette Picaud, Cornelius P. Rinne, Darija S. Radakovic, Fabio Py, Dorota-Katarzyna Samborski, Gail Scheuring, Gianni-Emilio Simonetti, Inge van Kann, Valerie Savarie, Nada Vitz, Ruud Janssen, Hubert Kretschmer, Litsa Spathi, Cecil Touchon, Topp & Dubio, Reid Wood, Clemens Stecher, Picasso Galinone, Yuko Ueno, John Welson, Pieter Zandvliet, Andrey Zhelkovsky, and others, especially for a project called BROTKATZE Collaborations.

For an art project called FLUXPORN he collaborated with several pornographic actresses like Lena Nitro, Violet Storm, Texas Patti, Annika Bond, Elly Darnell, Samira Summer, Medea Fox, Kiara Kane, Taya Lamai, Kitty Blair, Leonie Lingua and the Playboy photographer Marco Pallotti from Santa Monica.

Prizes

International artists' prize by Kleine Zeitung and Innovationskongress Austria, October 2010

References and notes

External links
 Artist's website
 No!art website
 Gallery
 What happened to the happening?
 Discogs list of Kommissar Hjuler
 Discogs list of Kommissar Hjuler und Frau

German contemporary artists
German experimental musicians
German experimental filmmakers
German industrial musicians
German installation artists
Language poets
German multimedia artists
Place of birth missing (living people)
Neo-Dada
Noise musicians
Outsider artists
German performance artists
German sound artists
German video artists
1967 births
Living people
People from Flensburg
Film people from Schleswig-Holstein